Ashburton College is a state coeducational secondary school located in Ashburton, New Zealand. It opened in 1965 following the merger of two Ashburton secondary schools: Ashburton High School and Hakatere College, and moved to its current site in 1974.

Enrolment
Ashburton College is naturally zoned by the school's relative isolation (the nearest alternative state secondary school is Mount Hutt College, 35 km away in Methven), therefore does not need to operate an enrolment scheme. The school has an effective service area of the entire township of Ashburton and much of the coastal half of Mid-Canterbury, with Mount Hutt College in Methven, Ellesmere College in Leeston, Geraldine High School in Geraldine, and the Pacific Ocean bounding the Ashburton College service area to the west, north, south and east respectively.

At the April 2013 Education Review Office (ERO) review of the school, the school had 1173 students enrolled, including twelve international students.  Fifty-one percent of students were male and 49 percent were female. Seventy-seven percent of students identified as New Zealand European (Pākehā), ten percent as Māori, four percent as Pacific Islanders, three percent as Asian, and six percent as another ethnicity.

Critical praise
In 2012 Ashburton College was first equal in The Clean Green Business Award, won the Large Business Award and was also named the Overall Supreme Award winner in the Ashburton Business Association biennial business awards.

In 2008, The Education Review Office ranked the school the top in the country for the promotion of male's learning.

Statistics from the 2008 NCEA results ranked the school fifth in performance out of the 19 decile seven to nine schools.

Ashburton College in the Media

Media Coverage.
Given Ashburton College's status as the much larger of two secondary schools in Mid Canterbury and the only secondary school based in Ashburton (Mount Hutt College is in Methven) the local newspaper, The Ashburton Courier provides coverage of the College's activities.

NCEA Statistics.
Ashburton College has consistently improved its performance in NCEA over recent years. In 2014 the College achieved a 90% pass rate across all Year 11 students, which is significantly higher than the national or decile scores. This result was also reflected in all sub-groups (e.g. gender, ethnicity) in Year 11.

Similar results and trends were also achieved for NCEA levels 2 and 3 (Years 12 and 13) students.

Notable alumni

 Paul Ackerley – Olympic gold medal winning hockey player
 Simon Barnett – radio and television personality
 Robyn Malcolm – television actress
 Simon O'Neill – tenor
 Hayden Roulston – Olympic silver medal cyclist

Ashburton Astronomy Group Observatory
The Ashburton Astronomy Group Observatory is situated in the grounds of Ashburton College. The building and equipment is owned by the college but administered and maintained by the AAG.

The primary instrument in use is a 130-year-old equatorially mounted 230mm With-Browning newtonian reflector telescope. The observatory is of the roll-off-roof variety.

References

External links
Education Review Office (ERO) reports  
Ashburton College Website  *Ashburton College Alumni Website

Secondary schools in Canterbury, New Zealand
New Zealand secondary schools of S68 plan construction
Ashburton, New Zealand
Educational institutions established in 1965
1965 establishments in New Zealand